Skyrail may refer to the following:
Transport
AirRail Link people mover at Birmingham Airport, England formerly known as SkyRail
BYD Skyrail, a commercial monorail system
Skyrail Midorizaka Line in Hiroshima, Japan
Skyrail Rainforest Cableway, Queensland, Australia
An elevated section of the Pakenham and Cranbourne railway lines in Melbourne, Australia
Other
A level in the computer game 007: Nightfire